Salin may refer to:

Places
Salin Township, township of Minbu District in the Magway Region of Myanmar
Salin, Myanmar, a town in Minbu District in the Magway Region of Myanmar
Salín, mountain in the Andes of Argentina

Other
Salin (surname)
Sálin, shorter name for the Icelandic rock band Sálin hans Jóns míns
Kasper Salin Prize, Swedish architecture prize

See also
Saline (disambiguation)
Salins (disambiguation)